John Bagwell DL, JP (3 April 1811 – 2 March 1883) was an Irish Liberal politician.

Bagwell was the son of Reverend Richard Bagwell and Margaret Croker. He was High Sheriff of Tipperary in 1834, a Deputy Lieutenant for County Tipperary and a Justice of the Peace. He sat as Member of Parliament for Clonmel between 1857 and 1874 and served under Lord Palmerston as a Lord of the Treasury from 1859 to 1862.

Bagwell resided at the family estate at Marlfield, Clonmel. He married Eliza Prittie on 21 June 1838 and they had six children Elizabeth, Margaret, Emily, Fanny, Richard and William.

References

External links

People from Clonmel
John
High Sheriffs of Tipperary
Irish Liberal Party MPs
1883 deaths
1811 births
Members of the Parliament of the United Kingdom for County Tipperary constituencies (1801–1922)
UK MPs 1857–1859
UK MPs 1859–1865
UK MPs 1865–1868
UK MPs 1868–1874
Deputy Lieutenants of Tipperary